The 7th th Supreme People's Assembly (SPA) was elected on 28 February 1982 and convened for its first session on 5 April 1982. It was replaced in 1986 by the 8th Supreme People's Assembly.

Meetings

Officers

Chairman

Vice Chairman

Deputies

References

Citations

Bibliography
Books:
 
  
 

7th Supreme People's Assembly
1982 establishments in North Korea
1986 disestablishments in North Korea